URGA International Joint Stock Aviation Company (Ukr. Міжнародна акціонерна авіаційна компанія «УРГА»), branded as Air Urga, is a charter airline based in Kropyvnytskyi and Zhuliany, Ukraine.

History 
The airline was established and started operations in August 1993. It was founded as International Joint Stock Aviation Company URGA, initially concentrating on charter flights. Regular passenger flights from Kyiv and Kryvyi Rih were added in May 1997. Air Urga is owned by the State Property Fund of Ukraine (51%) and American International Consulting Corp (43.5%). It has 378 employees.

In 2014, the airline launched its first regular passenger  flight - Kyiv-Lviv. 

As of May 2017, the number of destinations that the company can fly to has been significantly reduced due to being put on the EU's air safety blacklist along with 180 other airlines. URGA will be unable to fly to EU destinations until these safety issues are addressed. However, as of May 2017, the airline was not operating any regular passenger flights.

Destinations
Air Urga operates charter passenger and cargo flights from various Ukrainian airports to destinations in North Macedonia, Turkey, Syria, and United Arab Emirates. Its main base is the Kropyvnytskyi Airport (KGO).

Fleet 

As of June 2018, the Air Urga fleet includes the following aircraft:

 6 Antonov An-26-100
 2 Antonov An-26 (cargo aircraft)
 7 Saab 340B

One additional Cessna 172 is used as a training aircraft.

References

External links 

 

Airlines of Ukraine
European Regions Airline Association
Airlines established in 1993
Airlines formerly banned in the European Union
Ukrainian companies established in 1993